Magdalena Maleeva was the defending champion, but lost to Dinara Safina in the first round.

Anastasia Myskina won the title, defeating Amélie Mauresmo in the final 6–2, 6–4.

Seeds
A champion seed is indicated in bold text while text in italics indicates the round in which that seed was eliminated. The top four seeds received a bye to the second round.

  Jennifer Capriati (second round)
  Amélie Mauresmo (final)
  Elena Dementieva (semifinal)
  Anastasia Myskina (champion)
  Magdalena Maleeva (first round)
  Nadia Petrova (first round)
  Vera Zvonareva (quarterfinals)
  Meghann Shaughnessy (first round)

Draw

Finals

Top half

Bottom half

Qualifying

Seeds

Qualifiers

Draw

First qualifier

Second qualifier

Third qualifier

Fourth qualifier

References

External links
 Kremlin Cup Draw
 ITF tournament profile

Kremlin Cup
Kremlin Cup